The Accessible Books Consortium (ABC) is a public-private partnership which was launched in 2014 by the World Intellectual Property Organization. The ABC was created with the intent of being "one possible initiative, amongst others, to implement the aims of the Marrakesh VIP Treaty at a practical level." ABC's goal is "to increase the number of books worldwide in accessible formats - such as braille, audio, e-text, and large print and to make them available to people who are blind, have low vision or are otherwise print disabled."

Context 
The World Health Organization estimated in 2018 that worldwide 253 million people are visually impaired, with more than 90% of them living in developing and least developed countries. The World Blind Union (WBU) estimates that only 10% of people who are blind are able to go to school or have employment. World Blind Union (WBU) estimates that less than 10% of all published materials can be read by people who are blind or visually impaired, with the lack of accessible books being a significant barrier to getting an education and leading an independent life.

Work 
The Accessible Books Consortium (ABC) operates through three channels:

 The ABC Global Book Service: hosting an online platform that allows for the cross-border exchange of books in accessible formats. The Service contains titles in over 80 languages, with English, French and Spanish being the predominant languages.
Training and Technical Assistance: establishing projects in developing and least-developed countries to "provide training and funding for the production of educational materials in accessible formats in national languages for students who are print disabled."
Accessible Publishing: promoting the production of "born accessible" publications by all publishers. Born accessible books are usable by both people who are print disabled or sighted. ABC encourage accessible publishing through the ABC Charter for Accessible Publishing and the ABC International Excellence Award, which 'recognizes outstanding leadership and achievements in advancing the accessibility of digital publications'''.

 Accessible Books Consortium (ABC) Global Book Service 
The ABC Global Book Service is a free service that puts into practice the provisions of the Marrakesh Treaty. It allows participating libraries for the blind, referred to in the Marrakesh Treaty as Authorized Entities (AEs), to search, order and exchange books in accessible digital formats across national borders. Through the Service, Authorized Entities that are located in countries that have implemented the provisions of the Marrakesh Treaty are able to perform these exchanges without requiring further authorization from rights holders.

Through their participation in the Service, AEs are able to make the accessible books that are shared by all other AEs available to their own patrons. By pooling their collective resources in this way, libraries can vastly increase their selection of books in large-print, audio books, digital braille and braille music.

In April 2021, ABC launched an additional application that allows individuals who are blind, visually impaired or otherwise print disabled to have direct access to search and download books in accessible formats from the ABC Global Book Service. This new application is offered to Authorized Entities located in countries that have ratified and implemented the provisions of the Marrakesh Treaty.

 List of authorized entities that have joined the ABC Global Book Service 

 Training and Technical Assistance 
The Accessible Books Consortium provides training and technical assistance to organizations in developing and least developed countries on the production of accessible format books. According to the ABC: "the ABC model for capacity building aims to equip organizations in developing and least developed countries with the ability to produce educational materials in national languages to be used by primary, secondary and university students who are print disabled." This allows participating organizations to convert textbooks into accessible formats, such as DAISY, ePUB3, and digital braille. Such assistance has been provided to organizations including in Argentina, Bangladesh, India, Nepal, Nigeria, Sri Lanka and Tunisia.

In February 2021, ABC launched an online course providing similar training on the production of books in accessible formats, in part to 'ensure the continuation of its assistance programs during the COVID-19 pandemic'''.

Accessible publishing 
The Accessible Books Consortium encourages the production of accessible eBooks through the use of the accessibility features of the EPUB3 standard.

ABC International Excellence Award for Accessible Publishing 
List of winners:

ABC Charter for Accessible Publishing Signatories 
The Accessible Books Consortium Charter for Accessible Publishing contains eight principles designed to encourage publishers are following accessibility best practices. The Accessible Books Consortium partners include

Accessible Books Consortium advisory board members 
The ABC has an advisory board which provides technical expertise, transparency and communication with stakeholders. Its members are:
 African Union for the Blind
Blind Citizens of New Zealand
 DAISY Consortium
 Dedicon
 eBound Canada 
Government of Australia
 International Authors Forum (IAF)
 International Council for Education of People with Visual Impairment
 International Federation of Library Associations and Institutions (IFLA)
 International Federation of Reproduction Rights Organisations (IFRRO)
 International Publishers Association (IPA)
Manual Moderno
Sao Mai Vocational and Assistive Technology Center for the Blind
 World Blind Union (WBU)
 World Intellectual Property Organization

References

External links 
 Accessible Books Consortium official website

World Intellectual Property Organization
Accessibility
Book promotion
Consortia
2014 establishments in Switzerland
Accessible information